Sergey Sazonchik (born 20 October 2000) is a Belarusian footballer who plays for Slavia Mozyr.

Honours
BATE Borisov
Belarusian Super Cup winner: 2022

References

External links

2000 births
Living people
Belarusian footballers
Association football midfielders
FC Minsk players
FC BATE Borisov players
FC Slavia Mozyr players